Arthur is a ghost town in Stephens County, Oklahoma, United States. It was located 15 miles east of Duncan and had a post office from May 14, 1890, until September 29, 1934.  A post office was established there.

References

Ghost towns in Oklahoma
Populated places in Stephens County, Oklahoma